Mary Galvin may refer to:

 Mary Galvin (American academic)
 Mary Galvin (Irish academic)